The 2015–16 season was Atalanta Bergamasca Calcio's fifth consecutive season in Serie A after having been relegated to Serie B at the end of the 2009–10 season. The club competed only in domestic competitions, in both Serie A and the Coppa Italia.

Players

Squad information

 (captain)

Transfers

In

Loans in

Out

Loans out

Pre-season and friendlies

Competitions

Serie A

League table

Results summary

Results by round

Matches

Coppa Italia

Statistics

Appearances and goals

|-
! colspan="14" style="background:#dcdcdc; text-align:center"| Goalkeepers

|-
! colspan="14" style="background:#dcdcdc; text-align:center"| Defenders

 

|-
! colspan="14" style="background:#dcdcdc; text-align:center"| Midfielders

|-
! colspan="14" style="background:#dcdcdc; text-align:center"| Forwards

|-
! colspan="14" style="background:#dcdcdc; text-align:center"| Players transferred out during the season

Goalscorers

Last updated: 15 May 2016

Clean sheets
Last updated: 15 May 2016

References

Atalanta B.C. seasons
Atalanta